.az is the Internet country code top-level domain (ccTLD) for Azerbaijan. It is administered by Azerbaijani Communications (AZNIC).

Second-level domains
Second-level domains under .az are:
 com.az
 net.az
 int.az
 gov.az
 org.az
 edu.az
 info.az
 pp.az
 mil.az
 name.az
 pro.az
 biz.az
 co.az

References

External links
 IANA .az whois information
 WHOIS Server for .az

Internet in Azerbaijan
Country code top-level domains
Council of European National Top Level Domain Registries members
Computer-related introductions in 1993